Gabriel Boştină (born 25 May 1977 in Gura Văii) is a retired Romanian footballer who played as a midfielder.

Club career
After playing for the youth teams of Severnav Turnu Severin, Boştină made his professional debut for the same team, at the age of 20, playing in the Romanian third division.

In 1998, he is signed Cimentul Fieni and plays a full season in Romanian Liga II, before being requested by Oțelul Galați in 1999 and then Steaua București in 2002.

Boştină won two Romanian championships with FCSB in 2005 and 2006, when he also was an important member of the team, and played the semifinal of UEFA Cup in 2006.

International career

As of 30 June 2006, Boştină won four caps for Romania.

Honours

Club
FCSB
Liga I: 2004–05, 2005–06

External links

1977 births
Living people
FC Drobeta-Turnu Severin players
FC Steaua București players
FC Dinamo București players
ASC Oțelul Galați players
Romanian footballers
Association football midfielders
Romania international footballers
FC Universitatea Cluj players
Liga I players
People from Mehedinți County